Kajsa Margareta Bergqvist (born 12 October 1976 in Sollentuna, Stockholm) is a Swedish former high jumper. She won one bronze medal in the Olympic Games, one gold and two bronze medals in the World Championships in Athletics and one gold and one bronze in the European Championships. Her personal outdoor record of 2.06 m, set in Germany in 2003, is also a Swedish record. Her indoor record of 2.08 m, set at the Hochsprung mit Musik meeting in 2006, is the world indoor record.

Biography

Career
Bergqvist was born up in Sollentuna Municipality in Stockholm County. Her interest in sport began when she was 6 years old and tried sports such as football, volleyball, badminton, swimming, and cross-country skiing, none of which was able to keep her interest.

When she was 10 years old, she was persuaded by her big brother, Anders, to compete in Rösjöloppet, a long-distance track event. After that event, she began to try out several athletic events.

Bergqvist continued to train in several athletic events until she was 15 years old, when a new coach, Bengt Jönsson, came to her club, Turebergs FK. Soon after his arrival, he and Bergqvist chose to concentrate on the event that was her best, high jump.

She attended Southern Methodist University in Dallas (USA) in 1995–1999, with a degree in Advertising. She was the NCAA champion in 1997 with a clearance of 1.93 in the rain at the Indiana University over Amy Acuff of UCLA ending her streak at two. She won the NCAA meet again in 1999 with a height of 1.90 in Boise. In the season 1999, she tied Acuff's collegiate outdoor record of 1.95 (6-6). That record is sometimes omitted as it was set in international competition after the NCAA meet.

During 2001–2008 she lived in Monaco.

By 2004, lack of progress and long travel distances caused Bergqvist to end the relationship with her coach, Bengt Jönsson. She joined a group of athletes (including Olympic gold medalist Christian Olsson) under Yannick Tregaro.

At a competition in Båstad, on 18 July 2004, Bergqvist tore her Achilles tendon. Due to the injury, she missed the 2004 Summer Olympics in Athens, but managed to return to form just in time for the 2005 World Championships in Athletics in Helsinki. There she made an impressive series of jumps to edge out Chaunté Howard for the gold medal. Her Helsinki victory earned the Svenska Dagbladet Gold Medal for that year.

In 2006, she had been ranked the number one female high jumper in the world but failed to win in that summer's European Championships in front of her home fans in Gothenburg, having to settle for a bronze medal.

At the Hochsprung mit Musik meeting in Arnstadt, Germany, on 4 February 2006, Bergqvist set her first world record: she made an indoor leap of 2.08 on her first attempt, surpassing Heike Henkel's 2.07 m leap on 8 February 1992. The record was not totally unexpected since she jumped 2.00 m already in the warm up for the competition.

Bergqvist chose not to compete in the 2007 European Indoor Athletics Championships, opting, instead, to concentrate on defending her world outdoor crown. She had not started the indoor season well, and was nowhere near the form which had seen her set the world record the year before. It did not pay off as she finished 7th in Osaka.

Bergqvist married director Måns Herngren on New Year's Eve in 2007 and shortly afterwards, on 7 January 2008, announced that she would retire from high jumping. She had found her life entering "a new phase" and that she no longer felt as motivated to keep competing, even after her break in 2007.

Post-athletics
Since her retirement, she has been an ambassador for both UNICEF and the IAAF.

Personal life
Bergqvist married director Måns Herngren on New Year's Eve in 2007. The couple announced their divorce in early 2011.

In December 2011, Bergqvist confirmed in an interview that she is in a relationship with a woman, and stated: "As lesbian as I feel today, as heterosexual I felt when I was together with Måns. But when I get old and look back on my life, perhaps one can think that I'm bisexual." This announcement came after a period of rumours concerning Bergqvist's personal life.

International medals

High jump
Olympic Games
2000, Sydney – 1.99 m – Bronze
World Championships in Athletics
2005, Helsinki – 2.02 m – Gold
2003, Paris – 2.00 m – Bronze
2001, Edmonton – 1.97 m – Bronze
World Indoor Championships in Athletics
2003, Birmingham – 2.01 m – Gold
2001, Lisbon – 2.00 m – Gold
European Athletics Championships
2006, Gothenburg – 2.01 m — Bronze
2002, Munich – 1.98 m — Gold
European Indoor Athletics Championships
2002, Vienna – 1.95 m – Silver
2000, Ghent – 2.00 m – Gold
1997, Turku – 1.93 m – Silver
World Junior Championships in Athletics
1994 Lisbon – 1.88 m – Silver
European Athletics Junior Championships
1995, Nyíregyháza – 1.89 m – Silver

Other victories

High jump
1997: Bloomington, IN NCAA Women's Outdoor Track and Field Championship – 1.93 m
1999: Boise, ID NCAA Women's Outdoor Track and Field Championship – 1.90m
1999: Brussels (Golden League) – 1.97 m
2000: Stockholm (Grand Prix) – 1.96 m
2001: Vaasa (European Cup first league) – 1.92 m; Rome (Golden League) – 1.98 m; Monaco (Golden League) – 1.99 m; Berlin (Golden League) – 1.96 m
2002: Seville (European Cup first league) – 1.98 m; Lausanne (Grand Prix) – 2.04 m; Paris Saint-Denis (Golden League-meet) – 1.97 m; Stockholm (Grand Prix) – 2.00 m; Brussels (Golden League-meet) – 1.99 m
2003: Ostrava (Grand Prix) – 2.01 m; Lappeenranta (European Cup first league) – 1.96 m; Internationales Hochsprung-Meeting Eberstadt – 2.06 m (outdoor personal best)
2005: Gävle (European Cup first league) – 2.01 m; Zagreb (Grand Prix) – 2.00 m; Madrid (Grand Prix) – 1.98 m; Stockholm (Grand Prix) – 1.95 m; Sheffield (Grand Prix) – 2.03 m; Monaco (World Athletics Final) – 2.00 m
2006: Doha (Grand Prix) – 1.97 m; Málaga (European Cup super league) – 1.97 m; Athens (Grand Prix) – 2.00 m; Stockholm (Grand Prix) – 2.02 m; London (Grand Prix) – 2.05 m; Eberstadt (high jump-meet) – 1.98 m; Stuttgart (World Athletics Final) – 1.98 m
2007; Vaasa (European Cup first league) – 1.92 m; Sheffield (Grand Prix) – 1.95 m

See also
Female two metres club
High Jump Differentials – Women

References

External links

BBC Sports Article – (2005 World Championships in Athletics)

1976 births
Living people
People from Sollentuna Municipality
Bisexual sportspeople
Bisexual women
Swedish LGBT sportspeople
Swedish female high jumpers
Swedish expatriate sportspeople in Monaco
Olympic athletes of Sweden
World Athletics indoor record holders
Athletes (track and field) at the 1996 Summer Olympics
Athletes (track and field) at the 2000 Summer Olympics
Olympic bronze medalists for Sweden
LGBT track and field athletes
World Athletics Championships medalists
SMU Mustangs women's track and field athletes
European Athletics Championships medalists
Medalists at the 2000 Summer Olympics
Olympic bronze medalists in athletics (track and field)
Goodwill Games medalists in athletics
World Athletics Indoor Championships winners
World Athletics Championships winners
Competitors at the 2001 Goodwill Games
Sportspeople from Stockholm County